Caedmon's Call is the first major release from Houston, Texas-based outfit Caedmon's Call. It was recorded at Nickel & Dime Studios in Avondale Estates, Georgia.

Track listing 

 "Lead of Love" (Aaron Tate) – 3:58
 "Close of Autumn" (Derek Webb) – 4:56
 "Not the Land" (Webb) – 5:05
 "This World" (Tate) – 3:59
 "Bus Driver" (Webb) – 4:57
 "Standing up for Nothing" (Webb) – 4:58
 "Hope to Carry On" (Rich Mullins) – 2:49
 "Stupid Kid" (Webb) – 4:03
 "I Just Don't Want Coffee" (Webb) – 6:00
 "Not Enough" (Tate) – 3:42
 "Center Aisle" (Webb) – 5:47
 "Coming Home" (Tate) – 4:21

Personnel 

Caedmon's Call
 Cliff Young – vocals (1, 3–8, 10, 12), guitars (1–4, 7, 10, 12)
 Danielle Glenn – vocals (1–4, 6–10, 12)
 Derek Webb – vocals (1, 3–8), guitars (1–11), acoustic guitar (12), electric guitar (12)
 Randy Holsapple – Hammond B3 organ (1, 6, 7, 9, 10, 12)
 Aric Nitzberg – bass guitar (1–9, 12), upright bass (4, 5, 10)
 Todd Bragg – drums (1–10, 12)
 Garett Buell – percussion (1–5, 7–10, 12)

Guest musicians
 Don McCollister – 12-string guitar (1), backing vocals (2, 8), string arrangements (6)
 Brandon Bush – accordion (4), tack piano (5), Wurlitzer organ (8), Farfisa organ (8)
 Jane Scarpantoni – cello (4, 6, 10)
 Shiela Doyle – violin (4)
 Buddy Ottosen – human air brakes (7)
 Lori Chaffer – backing vocals (2)

Production
 Don McCollister – producer, engineer, mixing, editing at Orphan Studios (Avondale Estates, Georgia)
 Wayne Watson – executive producer 
 Brandon Bush – assistant engineer 
 Louis Lovely – assistant engineer
 Glenn Matulo – additional editing 
 Scott Hull – mastering at Masterdisk, New York City
 Buddy Jackson – art direction
 Karinne Caulkins – cover type artwork, back cover artwork 
 Hound Dog Studio – package design 
 Michael Wilson – photography

Release details 

1997, U.S., Warner Alliance 9362-46463-2, Release Date March 25, 1997, CD

References 

Caedmon's Call albums
1997 albums